Chokgyur Lingpa or Chokgyur Dechen Lingpa (1829-1870) was a tertön or "treasure revealer" and contemporary of Jamyang Khyentse Wangpo and Jamgon Kongtrul. Regarded as one of the major tertöns in Tibetan history, his termas are widely practiced by both the Kagyu and Nyingma schools.

Chokgyur Lingpa founded Neten Monastery in Nangchen in 1858. It is the seat of the Neten Chokling reincarnation line.

Neten Chokling Rinpoche and Tsikey Chokling Rinpoche are the fourth reincarnations of Chokgyur Lingpa.
This lineage traces back to Trisong Detsen, the Tibetan king who invited Padmasambhava to Tibet.

See also 
Lamrim Yeshe Nyingpo

References

External links
"Chokgyur Lingpa and his termas"
Lotsawa House – Translations of texts by Chokgyur Dechen Lingpa

1829 births
1870 deaths
Nyingma lamas
Tertöns
Tibetan Buddhists from Tibet
19th-century Tibetan people
Qing dynasty Tibetan Buddhists